Myfanwy Amy Elizabeth Shepherd (born 4 April 1991), known professionally as Myf Shepherd, is an Australian fashion model.

Early and personal life
She was born in Cairns, Australia in 1991 and attended Brisbane Girls Grammar School. She auditioned for Cycle 4 of Australia's Next Top Model, but was rejected by the judges. Only a few months later, she walked runways in New York City, London, Paris, and Milan.

Shepherd is a vegan.

Career
In March 2008, Shepherd signed with Chic Management in Australia and began modeling locally. In May, she traveled to New York City and signed with NEXT Model Management. She debuted at the Prada resort show in New York in June 2008.  A few months later, she was walking for notable designers such as Dior, Karl Lagerfeld, Marc Jacobs and Prada.

After the spring 2009 runway season, Models.com and Style.com featured her as a top-ten newcomer of the season. She subsequently appeared in an editorials for Numero magazine and Amica, and Australian Vogue featured editorials of her in their January, March, and July 2009 issues, for the last of which she also appeared on the cover.  She has appeared in editorials for American, Italian, British, Australian, and Japanese Vogue, V Magazine, Allure, French, Korean, and Japanese Numero, i-D, and Dazed & Confused, 'LA Times Magazine.  She has appeared in campaigns for Gucci, DKNY, Y-3, Sonia Rykiel and Levi's.

After walking numerous runways in February and March 2009, and appearing in an advertisement campaign for Levi's 501 for the Spring 2009 season.  She has also been featured in the Gucci Fall/Winter 2009 campaign, alongside Anja Rubik, Raquel Zimmermann and Abbey Lee Kershaw, and in the Sonia Rykiel Fall/Winter 2009 campaign.

In 2010, she decided to take a break from modelling. Before Shepherd decided to take a long hiatus, she has booked a few shows in New York and has walked for Jen Kao, Mulberry, Michael Angel, Reem Acra, Binetti and others. Although she only walked a few shows in New York, she also featured on the cover and an editorial for Dazed & Confused Japan.She has appeared in ad campaigns for Y-3 Spring 2010 (appeared in the video only) and Divination Verrier Spring 2010 (Video). She skipped the runway at RAFW 2010.

In 2011, she returned on the runway again from a long hiatus and has walked a few shows only in Milan and Paris such as Kenzo, Sportmax, Dsquared2, Sonia Rykiel and others. Besides, she has appeared in editorials for Numero China, Oyster, Vixen, Flair, Elle Spain, Viva! Moda, Pop Magazine, Vogue Taiwan, Double Magazine and many more. She has also featured in the Richmond Fall/Winter 2011 campaign with Josh Beech, OPSM eyewear Fall 2011 campaign and Louis Vuitton Menswear Fall 2011 campaign alongside Casey Taylor and Paul Sculfor.

In 2012, Shepherd starred in the new campaign for L'Oréal Melbourne Fashion Festival 2012 alongside Nicole Trunfio and Alexandra Agoston. She also featured in the Megan Park fall 2012 campaign and appeared in editorials for Marie Claire, Oyster, Jalouse, Viva!Moda and Bullett Magazine.

References

External links
 http://nymag.com/fashion/models/mshepherd/myfshepherd/
 http://www.vogue.com.au/fashion/five+minutes+with/myf+shepherd,21
 http://www.news.com.au/couriermail/story/0,,23859172-5012980,00.html
 http://models.com/models/Myf-Shepherd

1991 births
Australian female models
Living people